N-Acetylglucosamine (GlcNAc) is an amide derivative of the monosaccharide glucose.  It is a secondary amide between glucosamine and acetic acid. It is significant in several biological systems.

It is part of a biopolymer in the bacterial cell wall, which is built from alternating units of GlcNAc and N-acetylmuramic acid (MurNAc), cross-linked with oligopeptides at the lactic acid residue of MurNAc. This layered structure is called peptidoglycan (formerly called murein).

GlcNAc is the monomeric unit of the polymer chitin, which forms the exoskeletons of arthropods like insects and crustaceans. It is the main component of the radulas of mollusks, the beaks of cephalopods, and a major component of the cell walls of most fungi.

Polymerized with glucuronic acid, it forms hyaluronan.

GlcNAc has been reported to be an inhibitor of elastase release from human polymorphonuclear leukocytes (range 8–17% inhibition), however this is much weaker than the inhibition seen with N-acetylgalactosamine (range 92–100%).

Medical uses
It has been proposed as a treatment for autoimmune diseases and recent tests have claimed some success.

O-GlcNAcylation

O-GlcNAcylation is the process of adding a single N-acetylglucosamine sugar to the serine or threonine of a protein. Comparable to phosphorylation, addition or removal of N-acetylglucosamine is a means of activating or deactivating enzymes or transcription factors. In fact, O-GlcNAcylation and phosphorylation often compete for the same serine/threonine sites. O-GlcNAcylation most often occurs on chromatin proteins, and is often seen as a response to stress.

Hyperglycemia increases O-GlcNAcylation, leading to insulin resistance. Increased O-GlcNAcylation due to hyperglycemia is evidently a dysfunctional form of O-GlcNAcylation. O-GlcNAcylation decline in the brain with age is associated with cognitive decline. When O-GlcNAcylation was increased in the hippocampus of aged mice, spatial learning and memory improved.

See also
 Keratan sulfate
 N-Acetylgalactosamine (GalNAc)
 N-Acetyllactosamine synthase
 Wheat germ agglutinin, a plant lectin that binds to this substrate

References

External links
 Re Multiple Sclerosis 

Hexosamines
Acetamides
Membrane biology